Amani Takayawa is a Fijian rugby league footballer who represented Fiji in the 2000 World Cup.

Takayawa played for the Nadera Panthers in the Fiji National Rugby League Competition.

References

Living people
Year of birth missing (living people)
Fijian rugby league players
Fiji national rugby league team players
Nadera Panthers players